Third-seeded Ken Rosewall defeated Vic Seixas 6–3, 6–4, 1–6, 6–2 in the final to win the men's singles tennis title at the 1953 French Championships.

Seeds
The seeded players are listed below. Ken Rosewall is the champion; others show the round in which they were eliminated.

  Jaroslav Drobný (semifinals)
  Gardnar Mulloy (quarterfinals)
  Ken Rosewall (champion)
  Lew Hoad (quarterfinals)
  Vic Seixas (final)
  Budge Patty (fourth round)
  Mervyn Rose (fourth round)
  Fausto Gardini (quarterfinals)
  Bernard Bartzen (fourth round)
  Enrique Morea (semifinals)
  Felicisimo Ampon (quarterfinals)
  Sven Davidson (fourth round)
  Paul Remy (third round)
  Torsten Johansson (third round)
  Raymundo Deyro (fourth round)
  Giovanni Cucelli (second round)

Draw

Key
 Q = Qualifier
 WC = Wild card
 LL = Lucky loser
 r = Retired

Finals

Earlier rounds

Section 1

Section 2

Section 3

Section 4

Section 5

Section 6

Section 7

Section 8

References

External links
   on the French Open website

1953
1953 in French tennis